Hugo Louis Goetz (October 18, 1884 – April 4, 1972) was an American competition swimmer who represented the United States at the 1904 Summer Olympics in St. Louis, Missouri. In the 1904 Olympics he won a silver medal as a member of the second-place U.S. 4x50-yard freestyle relay team.

See also
 List of Olympic medalists in swimming (men)

References

External links
 

1884 births
1972 deaths
Swimmers from Chicago
American male freestyle swimmers
Olympic silver medalists for the United States in swimming
Swimmers at the 1904 Summer Olympics
Medalists at the 1904 Summer Olympics